Anthony Alegbe (born 10 October 1981) is a Nigerian former footballer.

Career

Club
Alegbe played in 1999 with Shooting Stars F.C. in the CAF Champions League. He had earlier left FC Karpaty Lviv of the Ukraine in December 2008, and returned to Nigeria and signed with Wikki Tourists F.C.

International
His first call for the Super Eagles was on 1 November 2002.

Career statistics

International

Statistics accurate as of 21 June 2016

References

External links
 

1981 births
Living people
Nigerian footballers
Nigerian expatriate footballers
FC Metalurh Donetsk players
Nigeria international footballers
Shooting Stars S.C. players
Enyimba F.C. players
Shamakhi FK players
FC Karpaty Lviv players
FC Kryvbas Kryvyi Rih players
Ukrainian Premier League players
Expatriate footballers in Ukraine
Nigerian expatriate sportspeople in Ukraine
Expatriate footballers in Azerbaijan
Nigerian expatriate sportspeople in Azerbaijan
TSG Neustrelitz players
Association football defenders